My Kind of Love may refer to several songs:

"My Kinda Love", 1929 song by Alter and Trent, also recorded as "My Kind of Love" by Sarah Vaughan in 1964
"My Kind Of Love", 1959 single by country singer David Frizzell
"My Kind Of Love", 1961 song from the musical Show Girl by Charles Gaynor
"My Kind Of Love", 1961 single by R&B group The Satintones
"My Kind Of Love", 1962 single by reggae band The Charmers (band)
"My Kind Of Love", 1965 single by blues/rock musician Alex Harvey (musician) and the Soul Band
"My Kind Of Love", 1967 song by reggae artist Dandy Livingstone as Sugar N Dandy/Dandy and his Group
"My Kind Of Love", 1968 single by country singer Dave Dudley
"My Kind Of Love", 1969 single by country rock band Poco (band)
"My Kind of Love" (Emeli Sandé song), 2012